The Hugo Historic District in Hugo, Oklahoma is a  historic district which was listed on the National Register of Historic Places listings in Choctaw County, Oklahoma in 1980.  It is located at U.S. 70 and U.S. 271.

The district is a 12 block area including 64 buildings, most built between 1900 and 1920.  The largest building is a  railroad depot building built in 1913.

References

External links

Historic districts on the National Register of Historic Places in Oklahoma
National Register of Historic Places in Choctaw County, Oklahoma